Museum Sønderjylland is a constellation of museums in the Southern Jutland region of Denmark, in the municipalities of Tønder, Sønderborg, Haderslev, and Aabenraa. It was formed in 2007 to gather focus on the history and culture of the region under one umbrella organization and unify resources. It consists of the following museums:

Haderslev Municipality

Gram Natural History Museum

Haderslev Archeological Museum

Aabenraa Municipality

Aabenraa Cultural History Museum
Brundlund Castle Art Museum

Sønderborg Municipality

Sønderborg Castle

Catherinesminde Brickworks

Tønder Municipality

Højer Windmill

Tønder Cultural History Museum
Tønder Art Museum

External links
Official Website (in English)

References

Museum Sønderjylland